Dottesio is a surname. Notable people with the surname include:

Attilio Dottesio (1909–1989), Italian actor
Luigi Dottesio (1814–1851), Italian patriot